Loningisa was a studio and record label based in Kinshasa in the Democratic Republic of the Congo (then known as Zaire).  Loningisa was made famous by the emergence of the African rumba band OK Jazz, whose music became popular, and a big influence on African and Congolese popular music.

OK Jazz included Francois Luambo Makiadi who emerged as Zaire's first true pop-music star, particularly his guitar playing abilities.  Franco and all other members of OK Jazz were tutored and trained at the Loningisa studios. The group formed via collective participation at Loningisa's studios as players in sessions and the house band titled 'Bana Loningisa' (Loningisa Boys).

See also
 List of record labels

External links
 Retroafric.com

References 

African record labels
Democratic Republic of the Congo music
Pop record labels